The British Rail Class 121 is a single-car double-ended diesel multiple unit. 16 driving motor vehicles were built from 1960, numbered 55020–55035. These were supplemented by ten single-ended trailer vehicles, numbered 56280–56289 (later renumbered 54280–54289).  They have a top speed of 70 mph, with slam-doors, and vacuum brakes.  The driving motor vehicles were nicknamed "Bubble Cars" by some enthusiasts (a nickname endorsed and made official by final passenger service operator Chiltern Railways).

The Class 121 is Britain's longest serving DMU, operating in passenger service for 57 years until 2017.

British Railways service

The Class 121 vehicles were introduced in 1960 for use on the Western Region of British Rail. They were used on various lightly used branch lines in Cornwall including the Looe branch, the branch lines off the main line in the Thames Valley including the Greenford Branch Line, the Bridport branch line (closed 1975), and the Severn Beach line in Bristol. In 1978 all of the units were still allocated to Western Region depots.

Unlike the earlier (but similar) , which had a small destination indicator in the roof dome, Class 121 had a four-character headcode box in the roof dome, with the destination indicator inside the top of the centre cab window.

Current operations
Upon privatisation of Britain's railways, the Class 121 fleet was only operated by one passenger company, namely Silverlink, with several more units in departmental duties with Railtrack. Since Chiltern Railways retired its final two units in May 2017, there have been no examples left in revenue-making service.

However, Network Rail operates one Class 121 for various departmental roles. This has been reclassified as a Class 960 departmental unit. Duties include route learning, video surveying of track and sandite application. In addition, the unit has been specially repainted in old BR blue livery. The unit is based at Aylesbury and was jointly used by Chiltern Railways for route learning.

Past operations

Silverlink
Silverlink inherited a small fleet of four "Bubble Cars". They were mainly used on the Marston Vale Line from Bletchley to Bedford, as well as non-electrified lines in North London, such as the Gospel Oak to Barking line. The units replaced the previous fleet of Class 108 and Class 115 units, and were supplemented with a fleet of Class 117 units cascaded from Thames Valley services.

The four units, nos. 55023/27/29/31, were based at Bletchley depot, where staff repainted set L123 (55023) into its original British Railways green livery. The others remained in obsolete Network SouthEast livery. In 1996, set L123 was withdrawn from traffic, and the other three were hired to Great Eastern for use on the Sudbury branch.  These returned to Bletchley in 1997/98. Two of the units (121027 and 121029) were repainted into Silverlink's purple and green livery, and the third (121031) was repainted into Network SouthEast livery. The three units also received names from withdrawn Class 117 units.
 121027 - Bletchley TMD
 121029 - Marston Vale
 121031 - Leslie Crabbe

The units were replaced on Silverlink duties in 2001 by Class 150 Sprinter units which had been cascaded from Central Trains. The units have all since been transferred to departmental duties.

Arriva Trains Wales
In 2006, 121032 was purchased by Arriva Trains Wales for use on the Cardiff Bay Shuttle. The unit has been repainted into Arriva colours and was hauled to Wales in June 2006 to enter service in July. The unit finally entered service on 16 August 2006 but was withdrawn 3 days later due to a major problem with the engine. The unit re-entered service on the Cardiff Bay line on 14 September 2006. In March 2013, following further extensive periods out of traffic, 121032 was finally withdrawn from service, due to a terminal engine fault. It was subsequently transferred to sister company Chiltern Railways and moved to Aylesbury at the beginning of 2014 and was later sold into preservation at the Wensleydale Railway, moving north at the beginning of May 2015.

Chiltern Railways

In 2003, Chiltern Railways reintroduced "Heritage" diesel multiple units on its Aylesbury to Princes Risborough shuttle service. For this purpose, unit 121020 was purchased from Network Rail, and heavily refurbished to allow it to operate passenger services. It was repainted into Chiltern Railways blue livery. The introduction of this unit allowed the release of a Class 165 "Network Turbo" unit. This unit has been fitted with secondary (magnetic) door locking and other safety features, and thus was exempt from 30 November 2005 deadline for the withdrawal of all Mark 1 vehicles. Electronic destination indicators and internal passenger information systems were recovered from "Network Turbo" 165 032 at refurbishment and fitted to this unit. The external exhaust pipes were rerouted through the brake van area.

In May 2011, a second "Bubble Car" was reintroduced to regular service. Unit 121034, previously based at Tyseley Loco Works, was (less extensively) refurbished for use by the Birmingham Railway Museum. It is painted in BR Green livery and was also used on Aylesbury to Princes Risborough services, when required.

Both units were additionally used on shuttles, as required, between Aylesbury and Quainton Road stations, on the occasion of events at the Buckinghamshire Railway Centre.

In March 2013, Chiltern Railways acquired 121032 from Arriva Trains Wales. It sold the unit for preservation in 2015.

Chiltern's two final units were withdrawn from service on 19 May 2017, due to difficulties in obtaining spare parts given the age of the units, which were more than 50 years old. They are to be sold.

Fleet details

Active units
Remarkably, considering the age of the fleet, the oldest unit (55020) was also the final unit withdrawn alongside 55034, which remained in daily service until 2017, whilst the youngest vehicle (55035) was the first to be dismantled. As of July 2014, 55021 (960021) and 55030 (960013) have also been scrapped.

Preservation
Class 121s have proved popular for preservation on heritage railways.

Order details

Model railways 
In 2006 Hornby Railways launched its first version of the BR Class 121 in OO gauge. Since 2017 Hornby have produced a basic representation of the prototype as part of their Railroad range in BR Class 121 in BR Green.

References

Sources

External links

The Railcar Association on Class 121s

121
Pressed Steel Company multiple units
Train-related introductions in 1960